Sam Yingling (born July 4, 1980) is an American politician from Lake County, Illinois. A Democrat, he is a member of the Illinois House of Representatives from the 62nd district. A resident of Grayslake, he served as the Avon Township Supervisor prior to his election to the legislature.

The 62nd district includes all or parts of Gages Lake, Grayslake, Hainesville, Long Lake, Round Lake, Round Lake Beach, Round Lake Park, Third Lake and Wauconda.

Early life, education and career
Yingling is a third generation resident of Lake County. After graduating from Carmel Catholic High School, he attended DePaul University, where he studied public administration and metropolitan land use. He then started a small business with his father. He later served as the President of the Round Lake Area Chamber of Commerce and as a member of the Round Lake Beach Cultural/Civic Center Foundation and an immigrant help organization, the Mano A Mano Family Resource Center.

Unhappy with the services that were being provided, Yingling ran for and was elected Avon Township Supervisor in 2009. As township supervisor he was the chief executive officer, chairman of the board of trustees and treasurer of all funds including all bridge and road funds. He handled the daily operations of the administration building.

During his time as supervisor he was an advocate for effective spending and efficient government. He led the township officials in cutting their own salaries by returning a raise implemented under his predecessor, reduced the budget without cutting services, and lobbied Springfield legislators to make it easier for voters to eliminate his job.

Illinois State Representative (2013–present)
The other three were Deb Mell, Greg Harris and Kelly Cassidy. He is the fifth LGBT representative ever elected. His associated state senator is Melinda Bush. During the push for passage of the Illinois marriage equality bill in 2013, he played an important role building support within his freshman class and among legislators from outside Chicago. The marriage equality bill passed the Illinois House on November 5, 2013 and was signed into law by Governor Pat Quinn on November 20, 2013. Immediately following the passage of the Illinois marriage equality bill on Nov. 5, 2013, Yingling proposed to his partner, Chicago businessman Lowell Jaffe, at an afterparty held by Gov. Pat Quinn at the executive mansion. They married in November 2015.

As of July 3, 2022, Representative Yingling is a member of the following Illinois House committees:

 (Chairman of) Counties & Townships Committee (HCOT)
 Energy & Environment Committee (HENG)
 Ethics & Elections Committee (SHEE)
 Housing Committee (SHOU)
 International Trade & Commerce Committee (HITC)
 (Chairman of) Property Tax Subcommittee (HREF-PRTX)
 Revenue & Finance Committee (HREF)

Electoral history

2020
Sam Yingling was re-elected to a fifth term in the Illinois House of Representatives in November 2020.

2018
Sam Yingling was re-elected to a fourth term in the Illinois House of Representatives in November 2018.

2016 
Sam Yingling was re-elected to a third term in the Illinois House of Representatives in November 2016.

2014
Yingling was re-elected for a second term in the Illinois House of Representatives.

2012
Sam Yingling was endorsed by the Illinois AFL–CIO, Equality Illinois  and the Chicago Tribune. In an upset, Yingling defeated Cole with 55.3% of the vote

References

External links
Representative Sam Yingling (D) 62nd District at the Illinois General Assembly
Sam Yingling for State Senate
 
Rep. Sam Yingling at Illinois House Democrats

Democratic Party members of the Illinois House of Representatives
LGBT state legislators in Illinois
LGBT Roman Catholics
Living people
Gay politicians
1980 births
People from Grayslake, Illinois
DePaul University alumni
21st-century American politicians